Mark Lindley (born 1937) is a noted musicologist and, more recently, a historian of modern India, and a teacher of economics.

Born in Washington, D.C., he studied at Harvard University (A.B.), the Juilliard School of Music (M.S.) and Columbia University (D. Phil.). He has taught at various universities, including Columbia University, City University of New York, Washington University, University of London, Oxford University, University of Regensburg, Chinese University of Hong Kong, University of Kerala, Istanbul Technical University, Yildiz Technical University, Bogaziçi University, and the University of Hyderabad, where he served in 2015 as the University Chair professor in the School of Economics. He has also lectured on economics at Gujarat Vidyapith, at Dr. Babasaheb Ambedkar Marathwada University and at the Gokhale Institute of Politics and Economics. He has held research fellowships at the Gandhi Research Foundation, and was a visiting professor in 2016 at the University of Zaragoza and in 2017 at the Central University of Gujarat. He serves now as "Professor of Eminence" (in the fields of ecological economics, Gandhian thought, and Western classical music) at The MGM University in Aurangabad. 

Lindley has identified himself as an atheist.

Works
As an historian of modern India, his concentration has been on the independence struggle, with a particular focus on Mahatma Gandhi and some of his associates. His writings on Gandhi include:

Gandhi as We Have Known Him, with Lavanam Gora (National Gandhi Museum, New Delhi, 2005; 2nd edition, 2009).

  Bibliography of Books Read by Mahatma Gandhi ], with Kirit K. Bhavsar and Purnima Upadhyay (Gujarat Vidyapith University, Ahmedabad, 2011).

Gandhi's Rhetoric (in Journal of Literature and Aesthetics, 1999).

Gandhi and Humanism (Humanist Chaplaincy, Harvard University, 4th ed., 2011).

Gandhi and the World Today (1998), A Recent American View (University of Kerala).

Gandhiji ko yeh kaise vishwagaya ki antarjatiya vivahse, jati pratha ka unmulan karna hosa (National Gandhi Museum, New Delhi, 1998).

 Gustav Le Bon (1841-1931), Ferdinand Tönnies (1855-1936) and Mahatma Gandhi (1869-1948) as Modern Psychologists (Mahatma Gandhi Mission, Aurangabad, 2018; 2nd ed., 2020).

Gandhi on Health (Gandhi Research Foundation, Jalgaon, 2018; 2nd ed., 2019)

  “A Comprehensive Sketch of What Mahatma Gandhi Said and Did re: Health, Nutrition, Hygiene and Health Care” (lecture delivered in 2019 in New Delhi to a joint meeting of the All India Institute of Medical Sciences and the Indian Council of Medical Research)

  An Account of the Historic Dialogue between Mahatma Gandhi and Babasaheb Ambedkar (with a preface by Ankushrao N. Kadam; Mahatma Gandhi Mission University, Aurangabad, 2020)

Popular Prakashan, Mumbai, published in 2007 Lindley's J. C. Kumarappa: Mahatma Gandhi's Economist, and in 2009 his The Life and Times of Gora, about a noted Indian activist and social worker who was also an associate of Gandhi (and, after Gandhi's death, of Kumarappa).

Dr. Lindley's writings on economics include the following:

Five Lectures on Money (University of Kerala, 2019).

The 'Economic Man' Premise (in Indian Journal of Economics, vol.96/No.283, 2016).
 
Modern Economics as a Would-be Science (Gokhale Institute, Pune, 2013; republished in Artha Vijnana, vol. 55/1, 2013).

  Looking Back for Insights into a New Paradigm], with James Farmelant.  MRZine.

  The Strange Case of Dr. Hayek and Mr. Hayek], with James Farmelant (in Journal of Social and Political Studies, Allahabad, vol.3/2, 2012).

  Some Historical Notes on Ecological Sensibilities in Modern Western Culture (University of Kerala, Trivandrum, 2016; revised 2020).

  A Proposal to Establish at the MGM University a Potentially Notable Ph.D. Programme in Ecological Economics (Mahatma Gandhi University, Aurangabad, 2020).

  How About a UBI Funded by Levies on Every Way of Destroying our Heritage of Natural Resources?  (lecture delivered in 2019 at the University of Hyderabad; published subsequently by Mahatma Gandhi University, Aurangabad, with a foreword by Herman Daly).

  Universal Basic Income in India too? A Dialogue (with Pulin B. Nayak; in Mainstream, vol. LVIII/50, 2020)

 Pastoralism and Gandhi's Village-ism; guest lecture, Mahatma Gandhi University, 2022.

Dr. Lindley is also known as the author of a great number of papers in musicology, and is regarded as an expert on the history of tempered tunings, of early keyboard fingerings, and of the chromatic scale. His musicological writings include:

"Innovations in temperament and harmony in French harpsichord music" (in Early Music, vol. 41, 2014).

 "Valuable nuances of tuning for part 1 of J. S. Bach's Das wohl temperirte Clavier", Berlin SIMPK 2011]

Beethoven's Variations for Piano, Opus 34: Genesis, Structure, Performance (with K.-J. Sachs and Conny Restle, Schott, 2007).

"Euphony in Dufay: harmonic 3rds and 6ths with explicit sharps in the early songs" (with G. Boone, in the 2004 Jahrbuch des Staatlichen Instituts für Musikforschung, Berlin).

"A quest for Bach's ideal style of organ temperament" (in M. Lustig, ed., Stimmungen im 17. und 18. Jahrhundert, Michaelstein, 1997).

"Marx und Engels über die Musik" (in Aufklärung und Kritik, 1997).

"A systematic approach to chromaticism" (in Systematische Musikwissenschaft/Systematic Musicology/Musicologie Systèmatique, 1994).

Mathematical Models of Musical Scales, A New Approach (with R. Turner-Smith, Verlag für Systematische Musikwissenschaft, 1993).

Ars Ludendi: Early German Keyboard Fingerings (Tre Fontane, 1993).

Early Keyboard Fingerings, A Comprehensive Guide (with M. Boxall, Schott, 1992).

"Stimmung und Temperatur" in F. Zaminer, ed., Geschichte der Musiktheorie, Vol. 6: Hören, Messen und Rechnen in der Frühen Neuzeit (Wissenschaftliche Buchgesellschaft, 1987).

"Keyboard technique and articulation: evidence for the performance practices of Bach, Handel and Scarlatti" (in P. Williams, ed., Bach, Handel and Scarlatti: Tercentenary Essays, Cambridge University Press, 1985).

Lutes, Viols and Temperaments (Cambridge University Press, 1984).

"An introduction to Alessandro Scarlatti's *Toccata prima*" (in Early Music, January 1982).

"La «pratica ben regolata» di Francesco Antonio Vallotti" (in Rivista Italiana di Musicologia, 1980).

"Early English keyboard fingerings" (in Basler Jahrbuch für Historische Musikpraxis, 1980).

"Early 16th-century keyboard temperaments" (in Musica Disciplina, 1974).

Some of Dr. Lindley's other publications have been:

  An Instructive Glimpse into Relations between Some 20th-century US Journalists and Presidents (Mahatma Gandhi Mission University, Aurangabad, 2020).

 “Some Disturbances to Mental Health During What Gandhi Might have Reckoned to be the Last ‘Day’ of Modern Western Culture as a ‘Nine-Days Wonder’” (lecture delivered at Savitribai Phule Pune University in 2019 and subsequently published by Mahatma Gandhi University).

  “Some Ideas for How Social Workers Can Make Use of Gandhi's Heritage (while ignoring his utopianism)” (lecture delivered at the University of Delhi in 2020 and subsequently published by Mahatma Gandhi University).

  “Anja Bohnhof and India” (lecture delivered in 2019 at the National Gandhi Museum, inaugurating an exhibition there, and subsequently published by Mahatma Gandhi University).

References

External links
  Website for Mark Lindley.
  another Website for Mark Lindley.
 Mark Lindley's book The Life and Times of Gora was narrated on YouTube by Ravi Kumar Dondapati in a series of twenty videos starting  here.

Mark Lindley, .

Mark Lindley, Gandhi's Challenge Now.

Mark Lindley, Kumarappa: A Giant or a Midget?. Economic and Political Weekly (May 2007).

Mark Lindley and Karan Kumar, . BIEN World Congress, 2018.

Mark Lindley and Ronald Turner-Smith, An Algebraic Approach to Mathematical Models of Scales. Music Theory Online (June 1993).

Mark Lindley, "Globalisation und Gewalt". Aufklärung und Kritik (October 2007).

J. J. Innes, "Kumarappa was a greater economist than Dr Sen: Dr Lindley".

Mark Lindley and Ibo Ortgies, Bach-style keyboard tuning. Early Music (November 2006).

James Farmelant and Mark Lindley, "Six Prominent American Freethinkers". MRZine.

Mark Lindley, "Marx and Engels on Music". MRZine.

Mark Lindley and James Farmelant,  "Looking Back for Insights into a New Paradigm".  MRZine.

Mark Lindley and James Farmelant,  "The Strange Case of Dr. Hayek and Mr. Hayek". Journal of Social and Political Studies (December 2012).

Jan Otto Andersson, James Farmelant, and Mark Lindley, "Ecologically dangerous patriotism".  Journal of Social and Political Studies (June 2014).

1937 births
Living people
People from Washington, D.C.
Harvard University alumni
Juilliard School alumni
Columbia University alumni
American musicologists
Historians of India
American humanists
American atheists